Donald Tye (March 7, 1913 – June 15, 1986), nicknamed "Tippy", was an American Negro league pitcher in the 1930s.

A native of Lockland, Ohio, Tye played for the Cincinnati Tigers in 1936. He died in Cincinnati, Ohio in 1986 at age 73.

References

External links
Baseball statistics and player information from Baseball-Reference Black Baseball Stats and Seamheads

1913 births
1986 deaths
Cincinnati Tigers players
Baseball pitchers
Baseball players from Ohio
People from Lockland, Ohio